Uzoamaka Nwanneka Aduba  (born February 10, 1981) is an American actress. She gained wide recognition for her role as Suzanne "Crazy Eyes" Warren on the Netflix original series Orange Is the New Black (2013–2019), for which she won an Emmy Award for Outstanding Guest Actress in a Comedy Series in 2014, an Emmy Award for Outstanding Supporting Actress in a Drama Series in 2015, and two SAG Awards for Outstanding Performance by a Female Actor in a Comedy Series in 2014 and 2015. She is one of only two actors to win an Emmy Award in both the comedy and drama categories for the same role. 

In 2020, Aduba played Shirley Chisholm in the Hulu miniseries Mrs. America, for which she won a Emmy Award for Outstanding Supporting Actress in a Limited Series or Movie and the Critics' Choice Television Award for Best Supporting Actress in a Movie/Miniseries. Aduba has appeared in films including American Pastoral (2016), My Little Pony: The Movie (2017), Candy Jar (2018), Miss Virginia (2019), and Lightyear (2022). In 2021, she starred in Lynn Nottage's play Clyde's on Broadway for which she received a Tony Award for Best Featured Actress in a Play nomination.

Early life
Uzo Aduba was born in Boston, Massachusetts, to parents from Nigeria, and grew up in Medfield, Massachusetts. She graduated from Medfield High School in 1999. She attended Boston University, where she studied classical voice and competed in track and field. She has called her family a "sports family". Her younger brother, Obi, played hockey at the University of Massachusetts Amherst and six seasons professionally.

Career

Early roles
Aduba first garnered recognition for her acting in 2003, when her performance in Translations of Xhosa at the Olney Theatre Center for the Arts earned her a Helen Hayes Award nomination for Outstanding Supporting Actress in a Play. In 2006, she played Amphiarus in The Seven at New York Theatre Workshop and again in 2008 at La Jolla Playhouse. In 2007, she made her Broadway debut, portraying Toby in Helen Edmundson's adaptation of Coram Boy at the Imperial Theatre. In 2011–12, she sang "By My Side" as part of the original revival cast of Godspell at the Circle in the Square Theatre. Her first television appearance was as a nurse on Blue Bloods in 2012. Aduba also played Anna, the mother of the title character in Venice at The Public Theater in New York.

2013–2019: Orange Is the New Black

In 2013, Aduba began portraying Suzanne "Crazy Eyes" Warren in the Netflix comedy-drama series Orange Is the New Black. On being cast, Aduba said:
I auditioned for the show back in late July or early August of [2012]. I had been auditioning that summer for more television and film [after doing much theater]. I'd read a lot of scripts and I remember reading Orange Is the New Black, and it was at the head of the pack. I remember thinking, 'Wow, that is really good, I would love to be a part of that.' I went in and auditioned for another part, and my representatives called me about a month later and they were like, "Hi, we have some really good news. You remember that audition you went on for Orange Is the New Black? You didn't get it." I go, "So… okay, what's the good news?" They said they wanted to offer me another part, Crazy Eyes. I was like, "What in my audition would make someone think I'd be right for a part called Crazy Eyes?" But to be honest, when I got the script for it, it felt like the right fit.
Casting director Jennifer Euston explains the selection of Aduba for the role thus: "Uzo Aduba...had her hair in those knots for the audition...They saw something amazing in her and were able to connect it to what they were looking for in Crazy Eyes." In joining the series, Aduba obtained her Screen Actors Guild card, of which she said, "I was just like, 'Wow, this means I'm a full actress now.' It was such a big deal, and I remember being so thankful and feeling so proud."

Aduba has been recognized for her performance as "Crazy Eyes", winning Outstanding Guest Actress in a Comedy Series at the 66th Primetime Creative Arts Emmy Awards and Best Guest Performer in a Comedy Series at the 4th Critics' Choice Television Awards. She was nominated for Best Supporting Actress – Series, Miniseries or Television Film at the 18th Satellite Awards for her season one performance. Aduba's season two performance earned her the Outstanding Performance by a Female Actor in a Comedy Series at the 21st Screen Actors Guild Awards and a nomination for Best Supporting Actress – Series, Miniseries or Television Film at the 72nd Golden Globe Awards.

Aduba won a second Primetime Emmy at the 67th Primetime Emmy Awards in 2015, winning the award for Outstanding Supporting Actress in a Drama Series. This makes her the first actress to win both a drama and comedy Emmy for the same role. Her performance in the third season also earned another Outstanding Performance by a Female Actor in a Comedy Series win for the 22nd Screen Actors Guild Awards. Aduba also earned a Best Supporting Actress – Series, Miniseries or Television Film at the 73rd Golden Globe Awards.

In March 2014, Aduba performed at Broadway Cares/Equity Fights AIDS benefit concert Broadway Backwards. She teamed with Rachel Bay Jones for a rendition of the song "Lily's Eyes" from the musical The Secret Garden. In 2015, Aduba played Glinda the Good Witch in the NBC live musical event special The Wiz Live!, receiving positive reviews from critics.

Aduba made her film debut in the 2015 musical comedy-drama film Pearly Gates. The next year, she starred alongside Maggie Grace in the comedy-drama Showing Roots, and played supporting roles in Tallulah, Steven Universe, and American Pastoral directed by Ewan McGregor. Aduba played a major role in the 2017 musical animated film My Little Pony: The Movie, voicing Queen Novo, leader of the hippogriffs/seaponies. She co-starred in two Netflix films; Candy Jar in 2018, and Beats in 2019. Also in 2019, Aduba played the title role in the film Miss Virginia.

2020–present: Limited series and theatre work 
After Orange Is the New Black ended, Aduba was cast as politician Shirley Chisholm in the Hulu miniseries Mrs. America, opposite Cate Blanchett and Sarah Paulson. Chisholm was the first black candidate for a major party's nomination for President of the United States, the first woman to run for the Democratic Party's presidential nomination, and the first woman to appear in a United States presidential debate. The miniseries premiered on April 15, 2020, receiving critical acclaim, and Aduba won a Primetime Emmy Award. She was cast to star opposite Lupita Nyong'o in the ultimately unproduced HBO Max miniseries Americanah written by Danai Gurira. Aduba also was set to star in the fourth season of FX series Fargo, but dropped out due to "some personal family issues". Aduba co-stars in the upcoming romantic drama film Really Love. In October 2020, she was cast as therapist Dr. Brooke Taylor in the fourth season of the HBO series In Treatment. On February 1, 2023 Netflix announced that Aduba will star in Shonda Rhimes' upcoming White House-set murder mystery series, ''The Residence.

Advocacy
In April 2017, Aduba received the Point Courage Award from the Point Foundation for her support of the LGBT community.

In June 2018, Aduba became Heifer International's first-ever celebrity ambassador to Africa. She saw Heifer's impact firsthand on 2016 and 2018 field visits to Uganda.

In July 2020, Aduba was announced as a minority investor in a then unnamed Los Angeles team, later unveiled as Angel City FC, that is scheduled to start play in the National Women's Soccer League in 2022.

Filmography

Film

Television

Stage

Awards and nominations

Notes

References

Further reading

External links

 
 
 

1981 births
Living people
21st-century American actresses
Actresses from Boston
Actresses from Massachusetts
American film actresses
American television actresses
Angel City FC owners
Boston University College of Fine Arts alumni
American people of Igbo descent
American LGBT rights activists
Igbo actresses
Outstanding Performance by a Female Actor in a Comedy Series Screen Actors Guild Award winners
Outstanding Performance by a Supporting Actress in a Drama Series Primetime Emmy Award winners
Outstanding Performance by a Supporting Actress in a Miniseries or Movie Primetime Emmy Award winners
People from Medfield, Massachusetts
African-American actresses